Nicola Conte is an Italian DJ, producer, guitarist, and bandleader, known initially for introducing an innovative style of acid jazz that incorporates bossa nova themes, melodies drawn from Italian film scores of the 1960s, easy listening themes, and traditional Indian music. Recently, he has focused much more on Latin jazz. This focus is evident in his albums Other Directions (2004, Blue Note & Schema) and Rituals (2008, Schema), and many remixes he has done for contemporaries stretching across many closely related genres.

Conte, a classically trained musician, is an innovative jazz revivalist and part of what was termed "The Fez Collective", based in the Apulian city of Bari, and the Idizioni-Ishtar/Schema Records, a record label known for promoting a distinctly Italian approach to acid jazz as well as jazz music as a whole.

Conte's first album was Jet Sounds (2000). The single "Bossa Per Due" gained international recognition and was an underground hit. It was used within a short time for a prime-time commercial for Acura automobiles. In 2002, the title track also gained recognition in the United States after it was used in two popular commercial advertisements for Joe Boxer underwear being sold by K-Mart stores. The album was licensed for US distribution by Thievery Corporation's Eighteenth Street Lounge (ESL) label in the summer of 2001 as Bossa Per Due (2001), and was a slightly reconfigured version of the Italian Jet Sounds album. This was followed by the remix album Jet Sounds Revisited (2002). Two years later, Blue Note's French subsidiary released Conte's next album Other Directions (2004). Conte released his next album, Rituals (2008).

Conte released The Modern Sound of Nicola Conte – Versions in Jazz-Dub (2009) on Schema Records. Unlike his 2002 remix album which featured artists largely reworking his songs, this two-CD set had Nicola releasing original titles and featured some of his jazz styled remixes of other people's works.

His album Love & Revolution (2011) was released on a deluxe two-CD set, and a standard single CD by Universal Classics and Jazz, while album Free Souls (2014) was released on Schema.

Conte has also produced albums by other artists including Paolo Achenza Trio (album Ombre, 1997), Rosalia De Souza (album Garota Moderna, 2008), Stefania Di Pierro (album Natural, 2016), and Marvin Parks (album Marvin Parks, 2017).

Discography

Albums
(all CD and vinyl; except Love & Revolution, CD only)
 2000 – Jet Sounds (Schema [Italy], 2000)
 2001 – Bossa Per Due [Jet Sounds retitled reissue] (ESL [US], 2001)
 2002 – Jet Sounds Revisited (Schema [Italy], 2002)
 2004 – Other Directions (Schema/Blue Note [Italy], 2004)
 2008 – Rituals (Schema [Italy], 2008)
 2009 – The Modern Sound of Nicola Conte (Schema [Italy], 2009)
 2011 – Love & Revolution (arranged by Magnus Lindgren) (Impulse!/Universal Italy [Italy], 2011)
 2011 – Free Souls (Schema [Italy], 2014)
 2016 – Nicola Conte Presents Stefania Dipierro – Natural (Far Out Recordings [UK], 2016)
 2018 – Let Your Light Shine On (With Spiritual Galaxy) (MPS [Germany], 2018)

Compilations
He has released several compilations, including:

Deep, Afrocentric, Modal Jazz series
(all CD only)Nicola Conte presents Spiritual Swingers ... Deep, Afrocentric, modal jazz From Universal Music Archives (Universal Music [Japan], 2008 / Universal Music [EU], 2009)Nicola Conte presents Mystic Prestige ... Deep, Afrocentric, Modal Jazz From Prestige Archives (Universal Classics & Jazz [Japan], 2014)Nicola Conte presents Blue Note Tribe ... Deep, Afrocentric, Modal Jazz From Blue Note Archives (Universal Classics & Jazz [Japan], 2015)

Viagem series
(all CD and vinyl; except volume 1, Viagem, CD only)Viagem (Far Out [UK], 2008)Viagem 2 (CD: Far Out [UK], 2009 / 10" LP: Old Gramophone Works/Far Out [UK], 2015)Viagem 3 (CD: Far Out [UK], 2011 / 10" LP: Old Gramophone Works/Far Out [UK], 2014)Viagem 4 (CD: Far Out [UK], 2012 / 10" LP: Old Gramophone Works/Far Out [UK], 2014)Viagem 5'' (CD: Far Out [UK], 2013 / 10" LP: Old Gramophone Works/Far Out [UK], 2013)

References

External links
 – official site

Year of birth missing (living people)
Living people
Italian electronic musicians
Club DJs
Italian DJs
Blue Note Records artists
Far Out Recordings artists
Virgin Records artists
Schema Records artists
Acid jazz musicians
Putumayo Department
People from Bari
Electronic dance music DJs